Kaththi Sandai is a 2016 Indian Tamil-language action comedy film written and directed by Suraj. The film is produced by S. Nanthagopal. The film features Vishal and Tamannaah in the lead roles. Jagapathi Babu, Vadivelu, Soori and Tarun Arora play pivotal roles. The project was launched in May 2016. The film released on 23 December 2016.

Plot
Arjun Ramakrishnan (Vishal) comes to Chennai to woo a psychology student named Divya (Tamannaah), on whom he has a crush. With the help of a local incompetent don named Deva (Soori), he succeeds in winning her heart. Divya's elder brother is Tamizhselvan (Jagapathi Babu), the honest and sincere DCP of Chennai. He approves of the relationship between Arjun and his sister, and soon, their wedding is fixed. One day, Tamizhselvan is kidnapped by some goons in retaliation for his thwarting of a black money scam six months ago. Arjun rescues Tamizhselvan and takes him home, only to reveal that he is actually a CBI officer who had discovered 250 crore stashed in Tamizhselvan's house as black money. 300 crore had been seized during the black money raid, but it was publicly announced that only 50 crore had been seized. Arjun takes away all the money but does not arrest Tamizhselvan due to his public reputation, instead of telling him to personally surrender later that day.

However, Tamizhselvan soon finds out that Arjun is not a CBI officer, but is a criminal who had recently been released from prison. He pursues Arjun with the aim of getting back the money. During the chase, he opens fire on Arjun's SUV, causing Arjun to lose control and meet with an accident, losing consciousness. Arjun wakes up in a hospital, having lost his memory. Tamizhselvan keeps Arjun in custody in a house, where a psychiatrist named Dr. Boothri (Vadivelu) is assigned to restore Arjun's memory so that he can reveal where he has kept the money. Unknown to anyone, Arjun had not lost his memory; he is only pretending as part of his mission to retrieve the black money. At night, he sneaks out of the house and steals the black money of a Union Minister (Jayaprakash), converting it to white money with the help of a hawala trader. However, Tamizhselvan and the Union Minister soon find out that Arjun had not lost his memory and has stolen even more of the black money. Arjun, confronted by Tamizhselvan and the Union Minister, reveals his motive for stealing the black money.

Arjun is from Manimangalam, a remote village with no basic amenities like roads, water, high schools, and even proper housing and sanitation facilities. When the building of the only primary school in the village collapsed, he confronted the local MLA Sivagnanam (Thennavan), who had falsely claimed to have developed the village, by pocketing all the money which was to be used for developing Manimangalam. Sivagnanam rudely sent him away, defending his corruption and even declaring that he would never develop the village. Following this, Arjun approached the Union Minister, who also turned out to be corrupt like Sivagnanam. Arjun's friends confront Sivagnanam and his men, who kill them all, including Sivagnanam. It is at this stage that Arjun had decided to get back all the black money acquired by Sivagnanam (which was the 300 crores recovered earlier in the film) and the Union Minister and use it to develop Manimangalam.

Arjun takes Tamizhselvan, the Union Minister and Divya to Manimangalam, which is now a very well developed village. He reveals that he had used the money hoarded by the Union Minister along with Sivagnanam's 300 crores to develop the village and had given the credit to him, because of which the villagers now hold the Union Minister in high regard. Tamizhselvan drops all charges against Arjun, seeing that he had stolen the money which was black for good intentions and arrests the Union Minister. In the credits, it is revealed that Divya and Tamizhselvan involve themselves in Manimangalam's development, along with Arjun.

Cast

Vishal as Arjun Ramakrishnan (Cheenu)
Tamannaah as Dhivya (Bhaanu)
Jagapathi Babu as DCP Tamizhselvan
Vadivelu as Dr. Boothri
Soori as Deva / Chithra Master
Tarun Arora as Tamizhselvan's accomplice
Jayaprakash as Union Minister
Thennavan as MLA Sivagnanam
Nirosha as Tamizhselvan's wife
Soundararaja as Soundar (Arjun's friend)
Aarthi as Boothri's assistant
Thadi Balaji as Boothri's assistant
Bava Lakshmanan as Boothri's assistant
Chinni Jayanth as Psychology Professor
Swaminathan as Tea Stall Owner
Madhan Bob as Doctor
Charandeep as Tamizhselvan's brother

Production
In April 2016, it was announced that Vishal and Suraj would team up for a film titled Kaththi Sandai, which would be produced by S. Nanthagopal of Madras Enterprises. Vadivelu and Soori were selected to play comical roles. The film marks the former's comeback as a comedian into Tamil cinema as well as his second collaboration with Vishal after Thimiru (2006). In May 2016, Tamannaah and Jagapati Babu were roped in to play the female lead and the antagonist respectively. Principal photography began with a puja ceremony held on 2 May 2016. In June 2016, Tarun Arora was cast in a negative role after Suraj was impressed with the actor's performance in Kanithan (2016). According to a report by Sify, Vadivelu completed his portions by the end of August 2016. Filming was wrapped up in November 2016.

Music
The film's soundtrack and the score are composed by Hiphop Tamizha while the lyrics for the songs were written by Na. Muthukumar and Hiphop Tamizha. Kaththi Sandai is one of the last films Muthukumar worked on before his death in August 2016. The soundtrack was released on 26 October 2016. Behindwoods gave a rating of 2.5/5 and noted that "Kaththi Sandai is a fun filled album from Hip-Hop Thamizha which is still filled with repetitive elements." Siddharth K of Sify rated the album 3/5 and labelled it "a mixed bag" while noting that "the usage of versatile choice of singers would have made a difference for the album overall."

Release
Kaththi Sandai was initially slated for a Diwali release on 28 October 2016. In early October 2016, Vishal announced through his Twitter handle that the film was postponed to a November 2016 release and that the soundtrack album would be released on Diwali instead. The film was later released on 23 December 2016.

Critical reception
Kaththi Sandai received mixed reviews from critics. Film critic and writer Baradwaj Rangan of The Hindu criticised the script and its execution, pointing out that the director "just wants to keep distracting you with songs and fights and comedy." He concluded his review by labelling the film as a "silly, noisy waste of a good premise" Thinkal Menon of The Times of India wrote, "With a not-so-proper characterisations for the ones who played prominent roles and a done-to-death plot, the film, overall doesn't engage." Gautaman Bhaskaran of Hindustan Times called it "a corny cocktail of bullets, bloodshed and buffoonery." Manoj Kumar R of The Indian Express wrote, "Be warned: Smoking tobacco causes cancer, watching this movie may have a similar effect on your mental health."

Srivatsan of the magazine India Today, like Rangan, criticised the screenplay, adding "Do yourself a favour and keep from watching Kaththi Sandai." Malini Mannath, writing for The New Indian Express labelled it as a "long and tedious affair" S Saraswathi of Rediff while calling Kaththi Sandai "a tedious action film" noted that both Vadivelu and Soori "appear to be wasted on this poorly-written script." A reviewer from Sify found the film to be "remotely original or interesting."

References

External links
 

2010s Tamil-language films
2010s masala films
2016 action comedy films
Films scored by Hiphop Tamizha
Films shot in Georgia (country)
2016 films
Indian action comedy films
Films about corruption in India
Indian heist films